The 2000 Canadian Senior Curling Championships were held January 22 to 30 at the Portage Curling Club in Portage la Prairie, Manitoba.

Men's

Teams

Standings

Results

Draw 1

Draw 2

Draw 3

Draw 4

Draw 5

Draw 6

Draw 7

Draw 8

Draw 9

Draw 10

Draw 11

Draw 12

Draw 13

Draw 14

Draw 15

Draw 16

Playoffs

Semifinal

Final

Women's

Teams

Standings

Results

Draw 1

Draw 2

Draw 3

Draw 4

Draw 5

Draw 6

Draw 7

Draw 8

Draw 9

Draw 10

Draw 11

Draw 12

Draw 13

Draw 14

Draw 15

Draw 16

Playoffs

Semifinal

Final

External links
Men's statistics
Women's statistics

References

2000 in Canadian curling
Canadian Senior Curling Championships
Curling in Manitoba
2000 in Manitoba
Sport in Portage la Prairie